Lyonetia yasudai is a moth in the family Lyonetiidae. It is known from Honshu, the main island of Japan.

The wingspan is 6.5–7 mm.

The larvae feed on Quercus acuta. They mine the leaves of their host plant.

External links
Revisional Studies On The Family Lyonetiidae Of Japan (Lepidoptera)
Japanese Moths

Lyonetiidae
Moths of Japan